John Ulugia (born 17 January 1986), is an Australian rugby union player. He played for the ACT Brumbies as either a prop or hooker. In 2010, he shifted to play in the Sydney club rugby competition and was signed by the NSW Waratahs for the 2011 season. He joined ASM Clermont Auvergne, French Top 14 rugby club, on 1 July 2014.

External links

Australian rugby union players
Rugby union hookers
1986 births
Living people
ACT Brumbies players
New South Wales Waratahs players
ASM Clermont Auvergne players
Aviron Bayonnais players
Rugby union players from Auckland
Canberra Vikings players
Union Sportive Bressane players